Savage Avengers is an ongoing Marvel Comics series where Conan the Barbarian teams-up with Wolverine, the Punisher, Venom, Elektra, and Doctor Voodoo. There was a preview of the series in the May 2019 Marvel's "Avengers" Free Comic Book Day issue. The premise of their team-up is that these heroes must work together when the evil wizards of Conan's world start trading spells with the Hand in Japan.

A second volume was later released that features Conan, Agent Anti-Venom, Black Knight, Cloak and Dagger, Elektra in her Daredevil appearance, and Weapon H in the Hyborian Age where they combat different opponents there and a Deathlok. Issue four was dedicated in memory of George Pérez. Issues six was dedicated in memory of Mike Pasciullo. Issue nine was dedicated in memory of Carlos Pacheco.

Fictional team biography

Volume 1

After Conan found himself in the Savage Land upon being transported from the Hyborian Age, he started slaying the Hand ninjas, but eventually is approached by Wolverine. After a misunderstanding, they fight, but eventually settled down and explained to each other their motives for being in the Savage Land. Conan has been transported from the Hyborian Age to the Savage Land, and plans to find the Third Eye of Agamotto, while Wolverine is searching for missing people. After they part ways, Doctor Voodoo is captured by the Hand ninjas and they bring him to the Cult Leader in the City of Sickles on the Savage Land, while simultaneously Conan finds Kulan Gath wearing the Eye along with a caged symbiote. The cult leader tells Dr. Voodoo that they are collecting the blood of Warriors in order to summon an Elder God named Jhoatun Lau, who will purge the world from mortals and bring his worshipers with him in his palace. Wolverine arrives, but is unsuccessful in saving Doctor Voodoo. Then the Hand ninjas revealed that they have exhumed the coffins of Punisher's family.

Volume 2
Conan breaks into a Cult of Set while Agent Anti-Venom and Elektra's Daredevil appearance find out about the madbomb that the Set cultists planned to unleash. The battle is crashed by a member of the Deathlok army who plans to erase Conan for crimes against the timestream. A man tries to mug Clayton Cortez only to find out the hard way that is Weapon H. Black Knight was in a nearby bar until he head to leave to break up the fight. After beating up some villains, Cloak and Dagger soon find themselves drawn to the fight between Conan and Deathlok alongside Agent Anti-Venom, Black Knight, Elektra, and Weapon H. Deathlok gives them a hard time until Conan strikes Deathlok's arm the same time the madbomb was activated. The injured Deathlok then opens a time portal as everyone is sucked in. Being dropped in a snowy location, Conan tells Agent Anti-Venom and Dagger that they are in the Hyborian Age.

Conan, Agent Anti-Venom, and Dagger find themselves in the middle of the Rabirian and Zingaran conflict. He finds out that there is a bounty on him. Elektra and Cloak find themselves in an area fighting opponents and the Hyborian version of Devil Dinosaur. Cloak was able to teleport it away as more opponents descend on them. Deathlok makes his way out of the ocean and gets directed to a blacksmith where he fixes his gun. At a fortress, a group of mercenaries and swashbucklers are honoring Kal-Urr the Cutthroat when it gets crashed by Black Knight and Clayton Cortez. After a brief fight, both men escape where Clayton changes his gamma frequency to assume another Weapon H form that evokes the traits of Red Hulk and Betty Ross's Red Harpy form as he flies Black Knight away. Conan, Agent Anti-Venom, and Dagger find themselves locked up in the dungeon. As Cloak and Elektra are thrown in the same cell, Deathlok arrives to attack Conan and those with him. In the nick of time, Black Knight and Weapon H (who returns to his normal Weapon H form) show up to help fight Deathlok as Cloak summons the Hyborian Devil Dinosaur. Conan's group gets away as a plan to get back to the present is made known. Word on Conan's return is made known as some cultists use their magic to summon Thulsa Doom so that they can use Conan's blood to issue in a new age of Set.

As Conan's group arrives at the Temple of the Beast, Deathlok catches up to them as Elektra has planned. Conan's group fights Deathlok until Black Knight uses Deathlok's technology to summon a laser sword. Weapon H then siphons Deathlok's gamma battery to briefly assume a Red Hulk form. Conan's group manages to subdue Deathlok as Elektra uses her Hand tricks on Deathlok. This is crashed by Thulsa Doom and his minions who saw Elektra's "necromancy" at work. As Conan fights Thulsa Doom, the others fight Thulsa Doom's minions as Elektra is confronted by the Beast of the Hand. Deathlok suddenly emits energy as he tells something to get out of his head.  Conan's group finds that Thulsa Doom's group managed to make off with Conan. At the edge of a river, Deathlok looks at his reflection in the water as it is revealed that he is an aged version of Miles Morales.

The aged version of Miles Morales recalls some of his past life before he was turned into a Deathlok by a mysterious person who wants him to hunt Conan. Then his Deathlok protocols start reinstalling. Conan is shown strapped to an X as Thulsa Doom plans to use Conan's blood to bring about the rebirth of Set. Agent Anti-Venom, Black Knight, Cloak and Dagger, Elektra, and Weapon H are trying to find where Thulsa Doom took Conan. As Elektra advises Weapon H to save his strength for when they find Thulsa Doom, Dagger keeps Anti-Venom and Cloak from fighting over her. Deathlok recaps to when he opened a prototype portal that the late Doctor Octopus had created and entered it where he fought some insect-like creatures that are part of the Annihilation Wave as the Deathlok protocols are restored. Thulsa Doom makes the final preparations to summon Set. In the nick of time, Conan's group shows up with an army of zombified Cimmerians. They fight against Thulsa Doom's cult as Weapon H assumes a Leader-like appearance. Back in Deathlok's flashback, it was shown that Miles was brought before Annihilus as he breaks free and makes off with Annihilus' Cosmic Control Rod. This flashback disrupts the Deathlok re-installation protocols. Thulsa Doom starts heading towards Conan and slits his throat with his sword in order to gain his blood which he uses to summon Set. Deathlok tells his computer that it's "time to put my game face on".

As Set starts to go on a rampage, Conan's group confronts Thulsa Doom for what he did to Conan. Deathlok shows up  to help them fight Set and Thulsa Doom in order to save the timestream. He starts by using his gamma battery to have Weapon H assume a Leader/Red Hulk/Harpy-like appearance. After saving Dagger, Agent Anti-Venom assumes a Symbiote Dragon-like form. Black Knight obtains the ceremonial blade as he becomes Bloodwraith while Dagger uses her light abilities to heal and revive Conan. As Thulsa Doom outmatches Deathlok, Conan fights Thulsa Doom as Elektra tells Black Knight that he is nobody's weapon. Deathlok provides the distraction that Conan needed to slay Thulsa Doom. With Thulsa Doom dead, all that was left was to deal with Set. Conan states that only the blood of twice-returned men can open the portal to send Set back where he belongs. Conan does that while Deathlok brings Anti-Venom, Black Knight, Cloak and Dagger, and Elektra back to their own time. No matter what legacy Conan left behind, he would know that he was an Avenger and his legacy would live forever. Once everyone is back in the present, Weapon H states that he can't change back to his human form while Agent Anti-Venom, Black Knight, and Dagger find that there's something wrong with this place. They discover that they are actually in year 2099 and are confronted by Jake Gallows who wants to know who they are.

In 2022, two scientist enter a room where an artifact was found. In 2099, the Savage Avengers are fleeing from Jake Gallows as Deathlok states to Elektra that his temporal circuits are depleted. As the Savage Avengers are teleported away by Cloak, Jake Gallows suspects that they might have something to do with a Deathlok. A mysterious figure is told about the Savage Avengers as it knows them. As Weapon H holds Deathlok accountable and asks him if he knows what year it is, the A.I. Lyla activates and states that they are 2099 and even brings up Jake Gallows while mentioning that he is the Punisher of this period. Agent Anti-Venom states that this Punisher is much crazier than the Punisher they know. The Savage Avengers make their way to the ruins of Avengers Mansion where they are attacked by Deathloks who work for the Prime Deathlok. Deathlok claims that they broke the timestream. Jake Gallows shows up and notes that the Deathlok with the Savage Avengers is not with the Prime Deathlok. As Jake Gallows and Deathlok fight the Deathloks, the Savage Avengers make their way into Avengers Mansion where they make use of its equipment. Elektra wields Archangel's wings, Black Knight finds himself wielding the Ebony Blade while riding a hoverbike, Cloak wields Doctor Octopus' tentacles, Agent Anti-Venom rides the Spider-Mobile, Dagger wields Doctor Spectrum's Power Prism, and Weapon H wields Absorbing Man's wrecking ball. The attacking Deathloks fell to Jake Gallows and the Savage Avengers. Prime Deathlok is shown to be a form of Ultron.

When the Corporate Wars began in 2067, Alchemax successfully reverse-engineered the Deathlok technology. Tyler Stone revealed to the press Formula-D, a nanotech solution that would convert human corpses into Deathloks. He dispatched these Deathloks against his financial competition. Alchemax's rivals at Stark-Fujikara desperately pursued alternative lines of research which would prove to be their fatal mistake when Ultron was reactivated. By 2099, the Deathloks have assimilated over 75% of the human population into their ranks. The Deathloks carved the future into their own image. As Ultron became Deathlok Prime, he managed to subdue the Public Eye who were used as a diversion so that Jake Gallows and the Savage Avengers can make their move. The Scourge of the Digital World named Fever calculates the Fever Protocols to be 99/87%. The Savage Avengers fight their way passed the Deathloks while Jake Gallows hacked into Fever's program using a program that can be classified as digital napalm. The Savage Avengers make their way to the central node. Deathlok Prime orders the Deathloks to bring the Savage Avengers to him as he also quotes "There's no room for Avengers in 2099". At Valhalla, Black Knight works on decrypting Ultron's files in order to find some software that can send them back to their own time. He finds that time-travel technology doesn't exist in 2099 due to the fact that the Baxter Building, Stark Unlimited, and the Sanctum Sanctorum are gone while also finding that Alchemax unearthed the Deathlok technology in 2022. Deathlok notes that this was because of when he lost his arm fighting the Savage Avengers back in 2022. Elektra breaks up the fight between Deathlok and Jake Gallows as she finds some names in the archives. At the heavily guarded Hellrock Prison for dissidents of Ultron's rule and has electrostatic generators that negates teleportation, it is ruled by a Deathlok version of MODOK called D.E.A.T.H.D.O.K. (short for Digitally Enhanced Autonomous Telepathic Host Designed Only for Killing). Cloak, Elektra, and Jake Gallows infiltrate Hellrock Prison with help from Deathlok and a stolen authentication code while the others provide a diversion. Deathlok's anger gives them away as D.E.A.T.H.D.O.K. is alerted of the situation as he is attacked by an invisible Dagger, Agent Anti-Venom, and Weapon H's Abomination form. Cloak, Deathlok, Elektra, and Jake Gallows are then attacked by Jigsaw 2099 who is a cyborg monstrosity. Dagger leaves D.E.A.T.H.D.O.K. for Agent Anti-Venom and Weapon H to deal with. Jigsaw 2099 proves to be a match for Deathlok and Black Knight. Cloak summons Jake Gallows' vehicles to deal with the attacking Deathloks. D.E.A.T.H.D.O.K. catches up to them while having entangled Agent Anti-Venom and Weapon H in his tentacles. Deathlok takes down D.E.A.T.H.D.O.K. since part of him is synthetic. Cloak reaches the area where the 2099 version of Doctor Doom is imprisoned and makes a deal with him to become an Avenger. Doom 2099 accepts if it will mean that he'll take his revenge on Ultron.

Doom 2099 recalls the day when Ultron and the Deathloks raided his castle in 2091 and took him prisoner. In the present, Doom 2099 is with the Savage Avengers and Jake Gallows as they flee in their Quinjet. Doom 2099 states that they have to obtain the Time-Array Gauntlet that brought him to 2099 if they are ever going to defeat Ultron while Deathlok takes out his old web shooters. A Deathlok attacks the Quinjet as Doom Supreme teleports off the Quinjet. The crash knocks out Cloak as the Savage Avengers are attacked by the Deathloks. Doom 2099 returns and attacks some of the Deathloks as Deathlok pulls Jake Gallows out of the rubble. Then they are attacked by an Ultimo who states that they are trespassing in Latveria. When Ultimo is subdued, Doom 2099 takes them to the abandoned fortress of Tiger Wylde as he states that he left the Time-Array Gauntlet here for safekeeping. As Doom 2099 interfaces with the fortress' network, too much neural feedback knocks him down. This is because Ultron had arrived first after underestimating Doom 2099 once and he now has possession of the Time-Array Gauntlet. Elektra tells Jake to protect Deathlok as she goes on the offensive against Ultron as he impales her. Jake Gallows and Deathlok go on the attack and knocks them down. Weapon H and Agent Anti-Venom go on the attack as Ultron reduces Agent Anti-Venom to a skeleton and Weapon H to a gray puddle which leaves Dagger devastated. As Ultron throws something at Dagger, Cloak takes the hit. With the Darkforce unleashed, Dagger merges with the Anti-Venom symbiote as it becomes a conduit for Dagger's incandescent fury. Tapping into an Alchemax Tactical Satellite, Ultron attacks Dagger. Black Knight then goes on the attack with Bloodwraith only for Ultron to slay him. As Jake Gallows and Ultron get to their feet and flee, Ultron retreats to his factory where he has it experimenting on the fallen Savage Avengers members where he turns them into Deathloks to further the Machine Empire's goals.

After a flashback to Jake Gallows' past, he and Deathlok arrive at a location where they are attacked by Deathlok versions of the Savage Avengers. Ultron orders the Deathlok Savage Avengers to dismember them. Deathlok and Jake Gallows struggle against them until Doom 2099 arrives. He tells Deathlok and Jake Gallows to retrieve his time gauntlet while he deals with the Deathlok Savage Avengers. Doom 2099 proceeded to tear through the Deathlok Savage Avengers like a knife until Deathlok Black Knight used a device to tap into the vibrational frequency of Doom 2099's armor. Order Jake Gallows to keep his body safe, Deathlok enters cyber-space to reason with the Deathlok Savage Avengers as each one claims that they deserved this fate. Jake Gallows slays different Deathloks while recalling more of his earlier fights with them 10 years earlier. As he places Deathlok's body in a safe location, Jake Gallows charges towards the Deathloks with two active grenades in his hands as he sacrifices his life to take them down. As Deathlok gets through to the Deathlok Savage Avengers, he gets disconnected when Ultron arrives. In the nick of time, the Deathlok Savage Avengers fight their programming and arrive where they connect to the Vats of Formula-D as they control the nanobots inside to restore their bodies back to the way they were before they were converted into Deathloks. Elektra's Daredevil form quotes "If you think you're going to  rule the timestream, you'll have to go through us first".

As Ultron strangles Deathlok, the Savage Avengers save him as they and Doom 2099 fight the Deathloks with Weapon H stating that he can finally regain his human form again. Ultron has Doom 2099 attacked by a Deathlok version of Jake Gallows. To combat the Deathloks, Elektra heads to the southwest holding cells where she frees the prisoners there who make up the Savage Avengers 2099. Black Knight brings Ultron into cyberspace where his programming can be rewritten as he strikes Ultron. As Deathlok Jake Gallows tries to eliminate Doom 2099, he starts to suffer from the memories of ten years ago upon Deathlok getting through to him. As Deathlok Jake Gallows attacks the time gauntlet, Ultron proceeds to attack Deathlok as the time portal starts to close. Deathlok uses his web shooters to obtain one of the Deathlok arms which he uses to erase Ultron as the timestream buckled and crashed into reality like a wave. The Savage Avengers return to their own time as they note that Deathlok was at the center of the temporal shockwave. Deathlok then arrives in the lair of Uatu the Watcher (who was narrating this story) as he identifies Deathlok as Miles Morales of Earth-807128. While Uatu congratulates Deathlok for his heroic actions and states that there are others who need him more than Uatu, Deathlok finds himself regressing back to his human form and is returned to his homeworld to enjoy his reward. Miles is reunited with his loved ones. Back in 2099, Jacob Gallows is alive and human again as Uatu narrates that Jacob Gallows ensured that Ultron's future never came to pass by burying Ultron's head in a graveyard to make sure that Alchemax or Stark-Fujikawa doesn't bring him back online. In the present, the Savage Avengers prepare themselves when Fin Fang Foom goes on the attack. When Elektra asks Weapon H as they should be together one last time, Weapon H quotes "Ah, what the hell. We're Avengers now, right? Then lets prove it"!

Members

First Savage Avengers

Second Savage Avengers

Collected editions

References

External links
 Savage Avengers at Marvel Comics wikia

Marvel Comics titles
Conan the Barbarian comics